Draw & Guess is a word-guessing drawing game, developed by the independent development company Acureus., where players draw pictures for other players to guess. It was released for Microsoft Windows, Linux and macOS on March 21, 2021 and has sold over 2 million copies.

Gameplay 
There are two modes in the game: Draw & Guess Classic mode and You Draw – We Guess mode. In Draw & Guess Classic mode, each player is given a subject in words and must express what it is by drawing it. When it was finished, it will be passed on the next player. The next player must guess what it is, and the word will be passed on the next player. At the end of each round, players will vote on whether the final word equals to the original word. The player who passed the vote will get a trophy. In You Draw – We Guess mode, one player is given a word and must express what it is by drawing it, while other players must try to guess it as quickly as possible. The game supports 2-16 people.

Reception 
Chinese gaming website  rated the game 8.3 out of 10.

Kaisei Hanyu of AUTOMATON says that its popularity in China is likely because it’s part of an already popular genre and has the perfect name to attract those who enjoy it.

Mio of IGN Japan says that there are not many parts where this work is particularly superior to other similar works.

Dustin Bailey of PCGamesN says that the game's popularity is predominantly focused in China, and its player counts drop off harshly outside of peak times in that region.

References

External links 

 
 

2021 video games
Windows games
MacOS games
Linux games
Multiplayer video games